Downtown Aquarium may refer to either of two public aquariums owned and operated by Landry's Restaurants, Inc.

Downtown Aquarium, Denver
Downtown Aquarium, Houston